Oleg Viktorovich Sinelobov (born 5 October 1962) is an Uzbekistani professional football coach and a former player. He also holds Russian citizenship.

He played for one season in the Soviet Top League for FC Pakhtakor Tashkent.

His son Oleg Sinelobov is now a professional footballer.

External links
 Career summary by KLISF
 

1962 births
Living people
Sportspeople from Tashkent
Russian footballers
Soviet footballers
Uzbekistani footballers
Uzbekistani expatriate footballers
Pakhtakor Tashkent FK players
Navbahor Namangan players
Uzbekistani football managers
Uzbekistan international footballers
Uzbekistani expatriate football managers
Expatriate footballers in Russia
Uzbekistani expatriate sportspeople in Russia
Association football midfielders
FC Nosta Novotroitsk players